The Stardust Best Comedy/Romance Actor is chosen by the readers of the annual Indian Stardust magazine. The Stardust Award honours a star that has made an impact with their acting in that certain Hindi film.

Here is a list of the award winners and the films for which they won.

External links

Stardust Awards